Dar Dash is an American actor. After receiving his degree at Arts Educational Schools, London, he starred in The Glass Cage at the Northampton Theatre Royal, where he made his stage debut.

Early life 
Dash was born and raised in Fairfax, VA. His father is of Persian descent, and his mother is Cuban with Spanish ancestry. Dash is the middle of five sons.

Career
As well as acting in numerous stage productions, Dash has also appeared in the AMC Miniseries, The Prisoner; the 2011 Raindance Film Festival nominated independent film, City Slacker; in Ridley Scott's thriller, The Counselor; and BBC's Jonathan Creek.

In 2014, Dash was nominated for Best Supporting Actor in a short at the Action On Film International Film Festival for his performance in the internationally acclaimed short film, Warhol, in which he co-starred alongside fellow American actor, Corey Johnson.

In October 2017, Dash played famed Nixon speechwriter and The New York Times columnist, William Safire in the play In The Event of Moone Disaster at Theatre503 in London. The Evening Standard described Dash's portrayal as "robust" and "droll"  and the overall production also received considerable critical acclaim.

In March 2018, Dash was nominated for Best Supporting Performance in a Comedy at the NAVGTR Awards for his performance as Hawkeye in Lego Marvel Super Heroes 2.

Dash is also a prolific voice-over artist for American and English brands.

In 2012, Dash — alongside his partner, actor Alexis Peterman — conceived Drink Me Eat Me, a “treat boutique” and event space to serve the local community tasty treats, sell locally produced handmade treasures, and host parties, events, classes, pop-up shops and dinners.  Drink Me Eat quickly became a bustling hub of West London.
To concentrate on their careers, Dash and Peterman sold the company in August 2015.

Filmography

References

External links

American male film actors
American male television actors
American male voice actors
American male video game actors
American male stage actors
English male film actors
English male television actors
English male stage actors
21st-century American male actors
American entertainers of Cuban descent
Living people
Year of birth missing (living people)
Actors from Fairfax, Virginia
American people of Iranian descent
Hispanic and Latino American male actors
Male actors from Washington, D.C.